The Savings Bank Building is a commercial building located at 101 South Front Street in Marquette, Michigan. It is also known as the Marquette County Savings Bank. The building was designated a Michigan State Historic Site in 1976 and listed on the National Register of Historic Places in 1978.

Description 
The Marquette County Savings Bank is a steel-frame, flat-roofed, rectangular building with a five-story front facade and seven-story rear.  The structure is faced with ashlar on the lower two levels and red brick on the upper five.  The front facade has a central recessed bay, with a one-story entrance flanked with granite columns at the bottom and gable at the top.  Above the entrance are stone panels decorated with a foliage design.   Surrounding the central bay are two semi-circular bays at each corner; the streetcorner bay is topped by a clock tower with copper roof.

Inside, the elevator, stairs, and lavatories are located on the south side of the building to deaden the sound of ore cars that once rumbled through town.  The basement and subbasement held the janitor and boiler room, a barbershop, and safety deposit boxes.  On the upper floors, offices were accessed via a central hallway.  The interior construction was of iron, steel, and tiling to resist fire; the only combustible building materials used were oak flooring and window and door casings.

History and significance 
The Marquette County Savings Bank was founded in 1890 by Nathan M. Kaufman, along with other prominent Marquette businessmen.  The bank grew rapidly, and within four months directors made plans to move from their temporary headquarters and construct a new bank building.  The lot at the corner of Front and Washington was purchased in January 1891. The new building was designed by the architectural firm of Barber and Barber and built in 1892 by Noble and Benson for a cost of $174,000.

The structure reflects the importance of late 19th century Marquette as an iron shipping port. Although there were originally balconies, the building is substantially intact, and is currently used as office space.

Gallery

See also

References 

Buildings and structures in Marquette, Michigan
National Register of Historic Places in Marquette County, Michigan
Commercial buildings on the National Register of Historic Places in Michigan
Commercial buildings completed in 1892
Michigan State Historic Sites